Odontomera ferruginea is a species of fly in the family Richardiidae.

References

Tephritoidea
Articles created by Qbugbot
Insects described in 1843
Taxa named by Pierre-Justin-Marie Macquart